John David Buckmaster is an Emeritus Professor of Department of Aerospace Engineering at University of Illinois, specialized in the field of combustion He finished his bachelor's degree from Imperial College London in 1962 and completed PhD under the supervision of Geoffrey S.S. Ludford from Cornell University in 1969.

Books

Honors
John Buckmaster was elected as the fellow of American Physical Society in 1986. He is also fellow of Institute of Physics (1999), Combustion Institute. He is the recipient of Ya. B. Zeldovich Gold Medal (2004) from Combustion Institute, Alexander von Humboldt U.S. Senior Scientist Award, Propellants and Combustion Prize (2002) from AIAA, etc. The Buckmaster equation is named after him.

See also

References

External links
 

1941 births
Living people
University of Illinois faculty
Cornell University alumni
Fluid dynamicists
Fellows of The Combustion Institute
Fellows of the American Physical Society